Waverly David Crenshaw Jr. (born December 17, 1956) is the Chief Judge of the United States District Court for the Middle District of Tennessee.

Biography

Crenshaw was born on December 17, 1956 in Nashville, Tennessee. Crenshaw received a Bachelor of Arts degree in 1978 from Vanderbilt University. He received a Juris Doctor in 1981 from Vanderbilt University Law School. From 1981 to 1982, he served as a law clerk to the Judges of the Chancery and Probate Court of Davidson County, Tennessee. From 1982 to 1984, he served as a law clerk to Judge John Trice Nixon of the United States District Court for the Middle District of Tennessee. He served as Assistant Attorney General of the State of Tennessee from 1984 to 1987. From 1987 to 1990, he was an associate at the law firm of Passino, Delaney & Hildebrand. He joined the law firm of Waller Lansden Dortch & Davis, LLP in 1990 as an associate, becoming partner in 1994; becoming the first African-American attorney and partner at the firm. He specializes in labor and employment law.

Federal judicial service

On February 4, 2015, President Barack Obama nominated Crenshaw to serve as a United States District Judge of the United States District Court for the Middle District of Tennessee, to the seat vacated by Judge William Joseph Haynes Jr., who assumed senior status on December 1, 2014. He received a hearing before the Senate Judiciary Committee on June 10, 2015. On July 9, 2015 his nomination was reported out of committee by a voice vote. The Senate confirmed his nomination on April 11, 2016 by a 92–0 vote. He received his commission on April 12, 2016. At the time of his confirmation, Crenshaw was only the second African-American federal judge on active status in Tennessee. He became Chief Judge on April 15, 2017 after Kevin H. Sharp resigned.

Personal life
Crenshaw was the first African American to become a member of the Belle Meade Country Club, a private golf club in Belle Meade, Tennessee, in 2012.

See also 
 List of African-American federal judges
 List of African-American jurists

References

Sources

1956 births
Living people
African-American judges
African-American lawyers
Judges of the United States District Court for the Middle District of Tennessee
People from Nashville, Tennessee
Tennessee lawyers
United States district court judges appointed by Barack Obama
Vanderbilt University Law School alumni
21st-century American judges